Orbinia papillosa is a polychaete worm distributed throughout New Zealand. Orbinia papillosa has a small pointed head without eyes.  Adults can grow in size to more than 100mm long, but are less than 2mm in width.

References 

Polychaetes
Worms of New Zealand